The Nuremberg Party Day Badge (German: Das Nürnberger Parteiabzeichen von 1929) was a highly revered political decoration of the Nazi Party (NSDAP). It was the second badge recognised as a national award of the party.

 
Also known as the "1929 Nürnberg Party Badge", the badge was awarded to those Nazi Party members who had attended the national rally in the city of Nuremberg. A special honour badge, the Party through regulations of 6 November 1936, established the badge for the 4th Reichsparteitage der NSDAP (4th National Party Day) in Nuremberg of 1-4 August 1929. Permission to wear the Nuremberg Party Badge was granted by the Gauleiter (Senior district leader). The wearing of the badge could be withdrawn by Hitler and the chief of the Nazi Party Chancellery, Martin Bormann.

After the founding of Nazi Germany, the Nuremberg Party Day Badge took on a symbol of the "Old Guard" and was frequently displayed by high-ranking leaders, including Adolf Hitler (who normally did not wear an excess of NSDAP awards) at subsequent Nuremberg rallies. The badge was to be worn on the left breast side of a uniform. It measured 21mm wide by 48mm high; it showed the Nuremberg Castle at the top with the word "Nürnberg" under it. An eagle sitting on top of a helmet was in the center with the inscriptions "1914-1919" and "N.S.D.A.P. 1929 Partei Tag" around it.

In November 1936, Hitler gave new "orders" for the "Orders and Awards" to be bestowed. The top NSDAP awards are listed in this order: 1. Coburg Badge; 2. Nuremberg Party Badge of 1929; 3. SA Treffen at Brunswick 1931; 4. Golden Party Badge; 5. The Blood Order; followed by the Gau badges and the Golden HJ Badge.

Notes

References 

Orders, decorations, and medals of Nazi Germany